Berthold I may refer to:

 Berthold I, Duke of Swabia (c. 1060–1090)
 Berthold I of Istria (c. 1110/1122–1188)
 Berthold I, Count of Tyrol